Megachile katonana is a species of bee in the family Megachilidae. It was described by Strand in 1911.

References

Katonana
Insects described in 1911